Ahmed Abdi Godane (10 July 1977 – 1 September 2014), also known as Mukhtar Abu Zubair,He was from Arap clan was the Emir (leader) of Al-Shabaab, an Islamist group based in Somalia with ties to Al Qaeda. Godane, who received training and fought in Afghanistan, was designated by the United States as a terrorist. He succeeded Mukhtar Robow who had held the position for several months after Aden Ayro's death. He was killed in a U.S. drone strike on 1 September 2014 in southern Somalia.

Early life
Ahmed Abdi Godane was born in Hargeisa, Somaliland on 10 July 1977. He hailed from the Isaaq clan, like Ibrahim "al-Afghani" who was another key leader in Al-Shabaab before his killing by Godane loyalists in June 2013. He studied Quran in Hargeisa and won scholarships to study in Sudan and Pakistan. He led a quiet, pious life, and reportedly wrote poetry.

While in Somaliland, Godane had worked for Al-Barakat, a Somali remittance company and the local franchise of Al-Itihaad al-Islamiya (AIAI). He was allegedly involved with Aden Hashi Farah Aero in the murder of a British couple Dick and Enid Eyeington, who ran a school in the region.

Islamic Courts Union

In mid-2006, he became secretary-general of the Executive Council of the ICU.

On 24 September 2006, the ICU captured the important port city from Barre Adan Shire Hiiraale leader of the Juba Valley Alliance, a tribal dispute has taken place between Habar Gidir leaders of the Al Shabaab faction within ICU and the Ogaden clan Ras Kamboni Brigades led by Hassan Abdullah Hersi al-Turki over the position of the military police leader. A compromise was reached where both groups agreed on appointing Ahmed Godane, an outsider who hails from the northern Arap clan as the head of military forces in the strategic city of Kismayo, Lower Juba.

Al-Shabaab

Al-Qaeda
In September 2009, Godane appeared in an Al-Shabaab video where he offered his services to Bin Laden. The video appeared to be a response to a Bin Laden from March 2009 in which he urged the Somalis to overthrow the newly elected President of Somalia Sharif Ahmed. In January 2010, Godane, speaking on behalf of Al-Shabaab, released a statement reiterating his support for al-Qaeda and stated that they had "agreed to join the international jihad of al Qaeda". For his allegiance to Al-Qaeda, the U.S. government announced a $7 million bounty for information leading to Godane's capture.

Tensions within Al-Shabaab
Godane and his close friend Ibrahim Haji Jama Mee'aad (aka Ibrahim Al-Afghani) both rose to prominence within Al-Shabaab at the same time but, despite their close relationship, the two men had widely divergent views on what the future of Al-Shabaab should be. This resulted in tensions within the organization and the alienation of many of Godane's oldest friends as it became apparent that Godane's agenda was transnational.

Death
In August 2014, the Somali government-led Operation Indian Ocean was launched to clean up the remaining insurgent-held pockets in the countryside. On 1 September 2014, a U.S. drone strike carried out as part of the broader mission killed Al-Shabaab leader Godane. U.S. authorities hailed the raid as a major symbolic and operational loss for Al-Shabaab, and the Somali government offered a 45-day amnesty to all moderate members of the militant group. Political analysts also suggested that the insurgent commander's death will likely lead to Al-Shabaab's fragmentation and eventual dissolution.

On 2 September 2014, al-Shabaab confirmed that Godane was travelling in one of two vehicles hit by a U.S. AGM-114 Hellfire missile strike the previous day. It was not immediately confirmed if Godane himself was among the six militants killed. The vehicles were heading toward the coastal town of Barawe, al-Shabaab's main base. On 5 September 2014, the Pentagon confirmed during the 2014 NATO summit in Wales that Godane had been killed in the attack. On 6 September 2014, al-Shabaab officially confirmed Godane's death and announced Ahmad Umar Abu Ubaidah as his successor.

References

1977 births
2014 deaths
Assassinated Al-Shabaab members
Assassinated al-Qaeda leaders
Deaths by United States drone strikes
People from Hargeisa
Somalian al-Qaeda members
Leaders of Islamic terror groups
People of the Somali Civil War